Tiago Costa may refer to:

 Tiago Costa (Portuguese footballer) (born 1985), Portuguese football right-back
 Tiago Costa (Brazilian footballer) (born 1987), Brazilian football left-back